Mahadiga is a documentary film about the Madiga Scheduled Caste community, directed by Lelle Suresh. It was released in 2004.

References

Documentary films about India
2004 films
2004 documentary films
Films about the caste system in India
Indian documentary films